David Lale (born 1981) is a cellist from the United Kingdom.
He is a member of the Lale String Quartet and plays regularly in a number of orchestras in the UK

including the BBC Symphony Orchestra and the Philharmonia Orchestra. David is the nephew of Australian cellist David Lale.

David studied under Anna Shuttleworth at the University of Leeds and Louise Hopkins at the Guildhall School of Music and Drama. He has performed as soloist with the Southbank Sinfonia

and with other orchestras.

Recordings
David Lloyd-Mostyn "tigh-nan-uiseagan"

References 

1981 births
British classical cellists
Living people